The Takisato Dam is a dam on the Sorachi River in west central Hokkaidō, Japan.

References

Dams in Hokkaido
Dams completed in 1999
1999 establishments in Japan